Baseball PEI is the provincial governing body for baseball in Prince Edward Island. It is a member of Baseball Canada and Baseball Atlantic.

History of baseball on Prince Edward Island 
Baseball was introduced to Prince Edward Island during the late 19th century and early 20th century, often by natives of Prince Edward Island who went to the United States to work, returning to or visiting Prince Edward Island. The first provincial championship was in 1896 when Charlottetown defeated the Pisquid club. After this point, the Maritime Amateur Athletic Association loosely organized provincial play-downs and championships to determine those teams representing Prince Edward Island at Maritime championships. On Prince Edward Island, organized and semi-organized leagues formed by the 1920s in various pockets of Prince Edward Island, especially in Kings County, Charlottetown, Summerside and western Prince County, and the health and popularity of these leagues ebbed-and-flowed through the pre- and post-war decades.

In 1964–65, the Prince Edward Island Amateur Baseball Association (PEIABA) was formed to take over the organizing of provincial play-downs and championships in order to determine the Prince Edward Island representatives at Maritime and National championships. Shortly after this time, the PEIABA began organizing county leagues. In 1969, the PEIABA took the responsibility of organizing and fielding a provincial representative for the quadrennial Canada Summer Games; and in 1989, also took on the responsibility of fielding the PEI Youth Selects, the Prince Edward Island representative at the Baseball Canada Cup. After this point, all teams that represented Prince Edward Island in a Maritime, Atlantic and National championship were determined by the PEIABA.

By the mid-1990s, the provincial government and other sectors required more organization from the PEIABA. On 12 September 1997, the PEIABA became a not-for-profit organization within the province of Prince Edward Island and changed its name to "Baseball PEI". Since that time, Baseball PEI has grown significantly. On top of running Elimination tournaments, provincial jamborees and championships, and fielding and organizing provincial teams, Baseball PEI now offers province-wide leagues from 9U/Junior Mosquito to 21U/Junior (with the Intermediate Kings County Baseball League also a member). Baseball PEI also is heavily involved with grassroots baseball; it assists associations with the set-up of Rally Cap and runs Rally Cap Jamborees. As well, Baseball PEI has the Summer Clinic Program, where teams and members of Baseball PEI can have two clinicians come out and run a clinic on a baseball skill (in 2018, there were 68 clinics run across Prince Edward Island).

Due to Baseball PEI's efforts at the grassroots level, and its dedication to improving the skills and enjoyment of its members, it has been named Baseball Canada's "Province of the Year" in 2013 (in which it shared with Baseball Ontario) and in 2015.

Mission statement
Baseball PEI is a non-profit organization that continuously enables the development of baseball skills and knowledge among youth across Prince Edward Island.

Structure

Board of directors

Baseball PEI has a Board of Directors that makes rules, policies and procedures concerning the managing of affairs, discipline, and operation of Baseball PEI teams, associations and competitions. The Board of Directors of Baseball PEI is as follows: 

President: Walter MacEwen
Director of Administration/Skill Development: Spencer Myers
Director of Provincial Teams: Janet Cameron
Director of 11U Competitions: Darrel Kirev
Director of 13U Competitions: John Munro
Director of 15U and 18U Competitions: Allison Macdonald
PEIBUA Supervisor of Officials (ex-officio): Kent Walker
Executive Director (ex-officio): Randy Byrne

Associations 

There are eleven minor baseball associations across Prince Edward Island that make up Baseball PEI:
Bedeque and Area Minor Baseball Association
Cardigan and Area Minor Ball Association
Charlottetown Area Baseball Association
Cornwall and Area Minor Baseball Association
Kensington Minor Baseball Association
Northside Minor Baseball Association
Sherwood/Parkdale Minor Baseball Association
Souris Minor Baseball Association
Stratford Minor Baseball Association
Summerside and Area Minor Baseball Association
Western Minor Baseball Association

"AAA" zones 

Each association is a member of one of four "AAA" zones across Prince Edward Island (each zone must have at least one "AAA" team in each age division each season).
Eastern (Souris, Northside, Cardigan, Stratford)
Capital District (Sherwood/Parkdale, Charlottetown)
Mid-Isle (Cornwall, Kensington, Bedeque)
Egmont (Summerside, Western)

Leagues and competitions 

Baseball PEI organizes and runs the following leagues:
9U/Junior Mosquito
11U "A", "AA", and "AAA"
13U "A", "AA", and "AAA"
15U "A", "AA" and "AAA"
18U "A" and "AA"
21U

Baseball PEI organizes and runs the following Provincial Jamboree/Championship.

Rally Cap (Jamboree)
9U (Jamboree)
11U "A" (Jamboree)
11U "AA" (Provincial Championship)
11U "AAA" (Provincial Championship)
13U "A" (Provincial Championship)
13U "AA" (Provincial Championship)
13U "AAA" (Provincial Championship; winner is awarded The Mitch MacLean Memorial Trophy)
15U "A" (Provincial Championship)
15U "AA" (Provincial Championship)
15U"AAA" (Provincial Championship; winner is awarded The Tanner Craswell Memorial Trophy)
18U :A: (Provincial Championship)
18U "AA" (Provincial Championship; winner is awarded The J. Vernon Handrahan Trophy)
21U/Junior (Provincial Play-Offs)

Grassroots Programming 

Baseball PEI is heavily invested with promoting grassroots development of players and coaches across Prince Edward Island. In the summer, their Summer Clinics Program runs clinics on hitting, throwing/pitching, fielding and other baseball fundamentals (as well as Rally Cap testing and the "My First Pitch" program) for teams and associations across Prince Edward Island. In 2018, there were 68 clinics ran across the province, mostly for players 11 and under, and in 2018, Baseball PEI hired three player clinicians. As well, Baseball PEI works very closely with its associations to offer the Rally Cap program, and runs Rally Cap jamborees in the latter part of August each year.

Other grassroots programs offered by Baseball PEI are the Winterball program (in partnership with schools across Prince Edward Island to distribute and implement over the past 10 years) and the Challenger program (in partnership with the Stratford Minor Baseball Association; this program is designed for players with a physical and/or mental disability).

Provincial teams 
Baseball PEI organizes and fields the following provincial teams each year:
The PEI Youth Selects (representing Prince Edward Island at the 17U Baseball Canada Cup each year [except Canada Games' years])
Provincial 13U Team (representing Prince Edward Island at the Baseball Canada National 13U Championships)
Provincial 15U Team (representing Prince Edward Island at the Ray Carter Cup [Baseball Canada National 15U Championships])
Provincial 16U Girls Team (representing Prince Edward Island at the Baseball Canada National 16U Girls Invitational Championships)
Provincial 18U/Midget All-Stars (representing Prince Edward Island at the Baseball Canada National 18U Championships)
Provincial 21U Team (representing Prince Edward Island at the Baseball Canada National 21U Championships)

PEIBUA 

All umpires used for Baseball PEI sanctioned-games are supplied by the Prince Edward Island Baseball Umpires' Association (the PEIBUA). The current Supervisor of Officials is Kent Walker. It is the PEIBUA's mandate to carry out all umpires' certification and recertification at the start of each season - usually in May - and to supply umpires for all Baseball PEI exhibition, tournament, regular season, Elimination and provincial championship games (as well as any Baseball Atlantic Championship games being held on Prince Edward Island).

Baseball PEI Award winners

2018 Baseball PEI Award winners

2017 Baseball PEI Award winners

2016 Baseball PEI Award winners

2015 Baseball PEI Award winners

2014 Baseball PEI Award winners

2013 Baseball PEI Award winners

2012 Baseball PEI Award winners

2011 Baseball PEI Award winners

2010 Baseball PEI Award winners

2009 Baseball PEI Award winners

2008 Baseball PEI Award winners

2007 Baseball PEI Award winners

References

External links 

 Baseball Canada
 PEIBUA

Organizations based in Charlottetown
Baseball in Prince Edward Island
Baseball governing bodies in Canada